Panama and its OTI member station, TVN started participating in the OTI Festival in the very first show, which was held in Madrid in 1972. Since then, the national broadcaster of this Central American country participated in every contest until the last, held in Acapulco in 2000.

History 
Although Panama, which selected their performers internally, never withdrew from the event, the national broadcaster never managed to achieve victory, although in their debut year, the performer Basilio and his song "¡Oh señor!" (Oh, my lord!) came second. In spite of the promising start of this Central American country, the following participations of TVN in the event were not as satisfactory. In 1978 the country ended in the top 5 for the last time. From then on, Panama's trajectory in the OTI Festival was lustreless as happened with the most of the Central American countries with the exception of Nicaragua.

Contestants

References 

OTI Festival
Panamanian music